Vinko Coce (22 December 1954 – 27 October 2013) was a prominent Croatian opera and pop singer.

Biography

Coce was born in Trogir and joined the Klapa Trogir in 1972. Between 1983 and 1988, he was a tenor in the mixed choir of the Croatian National Theatre in Split. He started a solo singing career in 1991, during which he won the Grand Prix at the Split Festival with the song "Sićaš li se, Lungomare". Coce also won a Porin with the Klapa Trogir.

Coce died on 27 October 2013 at Split Hospital after a lengthy undisclosed illness. He was 58.

Discography

Studio albums
 Mirno spavaj, ružo moja, 1993, Croatia Records
 Mama, adio, 1995, Croatia Records
 Dalmacija, more, ja i ti, 2000, Orfej
 Ane, jel' te baca, 2002, Croatia Records
 More sinje, 2006, Menart Records
 Morska svitanja, 2013, Scardona

References

External links
 
 diskografija.com – Vinko Coce 

1954 births
2013 deaths
People from Trogir
20th-century Croatian male singers
Croatian pop singers
21st-century Croatian male singers